Panglong University is a university in Panglong, Southern Shan State, Myanmar. It is a government institution, aimed at improving education in Southern Shan State. It was opened in 2002. Panglong Town is a well known member of the Panglong Agreement. The university now offers mainly undergraduate and postgraduate (bachelor's, master's and doctorate) degree programmes in education, sciences and law.
The university is composed of the major faculties such as Bachelor of Arts: English, history, geology, law, geography and Bachelor of Science: mathematics, zoology, botany, physics, chemistry. There are more than 1,000 students who have graduated from the university. In 2017 this university distance education offers mainly undergraduate and postgraduate (bachelor's) degree programmes in Education, B.A, B.Sc., L.L.B. The university of distance Education of the major faculties such as a Bachelor of Art: Myanmar, English studies, geography, history, Oriental studies and Bachelor of Science: mathematics, botany, zoology, physics, chemistry.

Programs
Panglong University's main offerings are Bachelor of Arts and Bachelor of Science degrees although it reportedly also offers some master's and doctorate level degrees.
Panglong University offers undergraduate and postgraduate degree programmes. The undergraduate programmes are subdivided into three categories: Arts (B.A.), Sciences (B.Sc.), and Law (LL.B). The choice of different fields of learning takes place in school where students choose particular subjects directed towards their tertiary education.

Main departments
Department of Botany
Department of Chemistry
Department of English
Department of Geography
Department of Geology
Department of History
Department of Law
Department of Mathematics
Department of Myanmar
Department of Oriental Studies
Department of Philosophy
Department of Physics
Department of Psychology
Department of Zoology

Each department offers an undergraduate degree programme. The Department of International Relations offers two: the Bachelor of Arts (International Relations) and the Bachelor of Arts (Political Science).

Leadership
The University of Panglong, now has been headed by an academic dean known as a rector.
 Dr Htay Aung
 Dr Nwe Nwe Yin
 Dr May Yi Thein
 Dr Khin Lay Nwe
 Dr Ni Ni Aung

External links

References

Universities and colleges in Myanmar
Arts and Science universities in Myanmar
Universities and colleges in Shan State